The High Commission of Namibia in London is the diplomatic mission of Namibia in the United Kingdom.

In 2012 a protest was held outside the High Commission by the conservation group Earthrace against the practice of seal culling in the country.

Gallery

References

External links
 Official site

Namibia
Diplomatic missions of Namibia
Namibia and the Commonwealth of Nations
Namibia–United Kingdom relations
Buildings and structures in the City of Westminster
Marylebone
United Kingdom and the Commonwealth of Nations